Kalinina is a rural locality (a settlement) in Krasnoye Rural Settlement, Sredneakhtubinsky District, Volgograd Oblast, Russia. The population was 427 as of 2010. There are 33 streets.

Geography 
Kalinina is located 14 km southeast of Srednyaya Akhtuba (the district's administrative centre) by road. Krasny Sad is the nearest rural locality.

References 

Rural localities in Sredneakhtubinsky District